The 1957 Tour de Romandie was the 11th edition of the Tour de Romandie cycle race and was held from 9 May to 12 May 1957. The race started and finished in Lausanne. The race was won by Jean Forestier.

General classification

References

1957
Tour de Romandie